The Races of Europe is the title of two anthropological publications
The Races of Europe (Ripley), an 1899 book by William Z. Ripley 
The Races of Europe (Coon), a 1939 book by Carleton S. Coon